Liu Kan (1906 – 3 March 1948) was a KMT general from Hunan. He committed suicide in 1948 after the division he was commanding was annihilated.

References

National Revolutionary Army generals from Hunan
1906 births
1948 deaths
People from Changde
Suicides in the Republic of China